XMI may refer to:

Masasi Airport (IATA airport code XMI)
Xinmi (geocode XMI), Zhengzhou, Henan, China; see List of administrative divisions of Henan
Miarrã language (ISO 639:xmi language code)
XML Metadata Interchange, a standard for exchanging metadata information
XMI, an ETF operated by Blackrock on the TSX; see List of Canadian exchange-traded funds
XMI (stock index), the AMEX Major Market Index
XM (album) (aka XMI or XM 1), 2003, the first XM album by Porcupine Tree

See also

 XMII (aka XM 2), 2005, the second XM album by Porcupine Tree

 XM1 (disambiguation)
 XML (disambiguation)